Cromore is a crofting township on the Isle of Lewis in the district of Pairc, in the Outer Hebrides, Scotland. The settlement is within the parish of Lochs. Cromore is about 27 miles away by road from Stornoway, the nearest town.

Cromore is an active crofting township close to one of Scotland's National Scenic Areas. Its wild and unspoiled beauty make it a draw for tourists. Some of the former croft houses are now in use as holiday cottages.

References

External links

Cromore, Lewis | Hebridean Connections
Monuments in Cromore | Hebridean Connections
Canmore - Ecc 73.1 Cromore, Gob A'stasieon site record
Canmore - Aurora: Cromore Bay, Loch Eireasort, North Minch site record

Villages in the Isle of Lewis